The 1892 Geneva Covenanters football team was an American football team that represented Geneva College as an independent during the 1892 college football season. Led by third-year head coach William McCracken, Geneva compiled a record of 3–3.

Schedule

References

Geneva
Geneva Golden Tornadoes football seasons
Geneva Covenanters football